Rik Heid is an American para-alpine skier. He represented the United States at the Winter Paralympics in 1988, 1992 and 1994. In total he won two gold medals, five silver medals and three bronze medals.

Achievements

See also 
 List of Paralympic medalists in alpine skiing

References 

Living people
Year of birth missing (living people)
Place of birth missing (living people)
Paralympic alpine skiers of the United States
American male alpine skiers
Alpine skiers at the 1988 Winter Paralympics
Alpine skiers at the 1992 Winter Paralympics
Alpine skiers at the 1994 Winter Paralympics
Medalists at the 1988 Winter Paralympics
Medalists at the 1992 Winter Paralympics
Medalists at the 1994 Winter Paralympics
Paralympic gold medalists for the United States
Paralympic silver medalists for the United States
Paralympic bronze medalists for the United States
Paralympic medalists in alpine skiing
20th-century American people